The 2023  Estoril Open (also known as the Millennium Estoril Open for sponsorship reasons) is a men's tennis tournament to be played on outdoor clay courts. It will be the 8th edition of the tournament and part of the ATP Tour 250 series of the 2023 ATP Tour. It will take place at the Clube de Ténis do Estoril in Cascais, Portugal, from 3 to 9 April 2023.

Champions

Singles

  vs

Doubles

  /  vs  /

Points and prize money

Point distribution

Prize money 

*per team

Singles main draw entrants

Seeds

1 Rankings are as of 18 April 2022

Other entrants
The following players received wildcards into the main draw:
  João Sousa
  Stan Wawrinka
  

The following players received entry from the qualifying draw:

Doubles main draw entrants

Seeds

 Rankings are as of 20 March 2023

Other entrants
The following pairs received wildcards into the doubles main draw:
  /  
  /

References

External links
 Official website

Estoril Open
Estoril Open
2023
Estoril Open